The Inhotim Institute is home to one of the largest foundations of contemporary art in Brazil and one of the largest outdoor art centers in Latin America. It was founded by the former mining magnate Bernardo Paz in 2004 to house his personal art collection, but opened to the public a couple of years later.  In 2014, the open-air museum was one of TripAdvisor's top 25 best-ranked museums in the world.

Located in Brumadinho (Minas Gerais), just 60 km away from Belo Horizonte, the institute has a total area of 1,942.25 acres, mostly located in the biome of the Atlantic Forest.  Of the total area, 1,087.26 acres are marked as preservation areas, of which 359 acres are part of the Reserva Particular do Patrimônio Natural RPPN, which makes it a natural heritage site. These geographic features made it possible for Inhotim to house a botanical garden, which has been developing since it was opened.

Etymology 
In the 1980s, Paz began buying tracts of land surrounding his modest farmhouse as developers threatened to destroy the natural landscape. The farm had been named by locals after a former owner, an English engineer known as Senhor Tim — Nhô Tim in Minas Gerais's dialect.

History
 

Paz soon converted the then 3,000-acre ranch into a sprawling, 5,000-acre botanical garden designed by his friend, the late landscape artist Roberto Burle Marx. The project began when Brazilian contemporary artist Tunga persuaded Paz to start collecting contemporary art. Eventually, he allowed artists all the space and resources they needed to create larger-than-life works. The garden, which boasts two dozen art “pavilions”, opened to the public in 2006. The pavilions include more than 500 works by noted Brazilian and international artists, such as Hélio Oiticica, Yayoi Kusama, Anish Kapoor, Thomas Hirschhorn, Dominique Gonzalez-Foerster, Steve McQueen, Cildo Meireles and Vik Muniz. One pavilion is devoted to one of Paz's ex-wives, the Brazilian artist Adriana Varejão.

In 2008, a geodesic dome designed by Paula Zasnicoff Cardoso of the Brazilian architectural practice Arquitetos Associados was constructed within a eucalyptus forest and now contains Matthew Barney's installation De Lama Lâmina [From Mud, a Blade] (2004–08), which shows a vehicle uprooting a tree. Chris Burden’s Beam Drop (1984–2008) is made of 72 steel beams dropped 45 meters from 150-foot-high cranes into a pit filled with wet cement. Sonic Pavilion by Doug Aitken was realized in 2009 and consists of a circular building of frosted glass on top of a hill which contains a well. This goes down 200 meters into the ground and at its bottom microphones capture the sounds of the earth, which are then amplified and played live in the gallery above. Vegetation Room (2012) by Cristina Iglesias is a cube of polished stainless steel reflecting the surrounding forest. Visitors slip into crevices where the walls are sculpted foliage, entering a labyrinth within the labyrinth; at the cube's heart, torrents of water periodically rush.

Botanical Garden 
In 2011, Inhotim joined the Brazilian government's official botanical garden association, and the staff has begun an inventory of its 5,000 plant species, including 1,300 types of palm alone. This represents more than 28% of botanical families known to man, and helped the institution receive the title of Private Reserve of Natural Patrimony of Inhotim (RPPN).

Inhotim Institute is the only place in Latin America that has the Carrion Flower, a species native to Asia and famous for being the biggest flower in the world.  It is also known for the strong odor it releases when blooming, which has given it the alternative name of "corpse flower".  In Inhotim, it bloomed for the first time on December 15, 2010, and again on December 27, 2012.  The flower is located in the "Viveiro Educador", in the Equatorial Greenhouse, and is open for visitation by the public.

Management
In 2008, Inhotim's status was changed from a private museum to a public institute, with an annual budget and a board of directors. Although the plan is for the place eventually to be self-funding, at the moment it is largely financed by Paz. Inhotim costs about $10 million to run a year, with about 15% of this coming from ticket receipts.

Jochen Volz has been the artistic director since 2004. Paz has plans to expand Inhotim with ten or more new hotels, a 15,000-capacity amphitheater, and even a complex of "lofts" for those who want to live amid the collection.

In 2017, Inhotim's original founder Bernardo Paz was convicted of money laundering and sentenced to nine years in prison. Allegedly, between 2007 and 2008 Paz received more than $98 million related to fund-raising for Inhotim, some of which was diverted to other companies.

Attendance
In 2009, around 133,000 people travelled to Inhotim In 2011, the park attracted nearly 250,000 visitors from all over the world.  In August 2018, they reached the mark of 3 million visitors.

Gallery

See also
 List of sculpture parks

References

External links
 Inhotim website

Art museums and galleries in Brazil
Botanical gardens in Brazil
Museums in Minas Gerais
Sculpture gardens, trails and parks in South America
2006 establishments in Brazil
Culture in Minas Gerais